Reno Bent Olsen  (born 19 February 1947) is a retired Danish cyclist. Competing in the track team pursuit he won a gold medal at the 1968 Summer Olympics and the national title in 1966–68 and 1971–73. As a road racer he held the individual Danish title in 1972 and 1973 and competed professionally in 1974–75 and 1981–84, but without much success.

References 

1947 births
Living people
Cyclists at the 1968 Summer Olympics
Cyclists at the 1972 Summer Olympics
Olympic cyclists of Denmark
Olympic gold medalists for Denmark
Danish male cyclists
Olympic medalists in cycling
People from Roskilde
Medalists at the 1968 Summer Olympics
Danish track cyclists
Sportspeople from Region Zealand